Victor Hayden Bartolome (born September 29, 1948) is an American former professional basketball player.  He played in college at the Oregon State University, and was drafted in the sixth round of the 1970 NBA draft by the Golden State Warriors.  He played in 38 games for the Warriors through the 1971–72 season. He then played professional basketball in Livorno, Italy and on various teams in the Netherlands until retiring in 1979, after winning the Dutch national championship with Leiden.

References

External links
 Database Basketball – Vic Bartolome stats

1948 births
Living people
American expatriate basketball people in Italy
American expatriate basketball people in the Netherlands
American men's basketball players
Basketball players from California
B.S. Leiden players
Centers (basketball)
Oregon State Beavers men's basketball players
San Francisco Warriors players
San Francisco Warriors draft picks
Sportspeople from Santa Barbara, California